Sylhet International Cricket Stadium also known as Sylhet Stadium and previously known as Sylhet Divisional Stadium, is a cricket stadium in Sylhet, Bangladesh. The stadium went a thorough expansion in 2013, to host matches for the 2014 ICC World Twenty20 and 2014 ICC Women's World Twenty20. The stadium hosted its first international match on 17 March 2014 with Ireland taking on Zimbabwe.

History
The stadium was built in 2007, as a divisional cricket stadium. The stadium is surrounded by hills and has a scenic view. England Lions, England Under-19 and Nepal Under-19 have played here.

Renovation and expansion
The stadium was expanded and renovated to host matches of the 2014 ICC World Twenty20. The renovation began in June 2013 and ended in mid-November 2013. The main pavilion building and the media centre have been constructed, floodlights have been installed, and seating arrangements were modified. Another more striking part of the stadium is the newly built, country's first 'Green gallery'.

The venue was again renovated in 2017 in order to upgrade the venue as an international standard stadium. A second tier was built in the east side gallery, increasing the seating capacity by 5000 and the green hillock was remodified. As a result, the venue hosted the first leg of BPL 2017 matches.

It is the only Stadium in Bangladesh to have a Green Gallery. It also has Northern and Western Stand, Club House and Grand Stand. All this new expanded & renovated look of this stadium was designed by architect Masudur Rahman Khan. Executing & implementation authority: Bangladesh Sports Council. Requiring body: Bangladesh Cricket Board & Sylhet Divisional Sports Authority.

Records
No of matches hosted

 Test matches — 1
 One day international — 4
 T20I — 8

Records
 In a 2014 ICC World Twenty20 qualifying match between Ireland and Netherlands, both teams were fighting for a spot in the Super 10. Ireland batted first & scored 189–4. Netherlands needed to win the match within 13.5 overs to qualify for Super 10's. If they do so, they would qualify for Super 10's. If they only win the match without winning it in 13.5 overs, then Zimbabwe will qualify for the Super 10's. But if their current opponents win, then Ireland would be qualified. This match holds a few records.
 1- Netherlands scored fastest 100 in just 6.6 ovs, fastest for any team in T20I.
 2- Netherlands scored fastest 150 in just 10.3 ovs, fastest for any team in T20I.
 3- Netherlands won the match with 37 balls to spare, which is fastest win for any team in T20I chasing 180 runs.
 Taijul Islam became only 4th Bangladeshi bowler to take a 10 wicket-haul in Test cricket. He also holds the record of third best bowling figure (11/170) in a test match by any Bangladeshi bowler.
 In  March 2020, when Zimbabwe toured Bangladesh, in the three match ODI series, few records were created:
 In the first ODI:
 Bangladesh won the match by 169 runs, their biggest winning margin in ODIs.
 Mashrafe Mortaza took his 100th wicket as captain in ODIs and his 700th wicket of his career.
 In the Second ODI, Tamim Iqbal became the first batsman for Bangladesh to score 7,000 runs in ODIs.
 In the third ODI:
 Tamim Iqbal and Liton Das made a partnership of 292 runs which is the highest partnership for any wicket for Bangladesh.
 Liton Das scored 176 runs off 143 balls, highest individual score by any Bangladeshi batsman in ODIs.
 Liton Das hit 8 sixes, and a total of 24 boundaries (16 fours and 8 sixes), the most by any Bangladeshi batsman in an ODI match.

Facts
 In 2013 when New Zealand toured Bangladesh, the venue was proposed to host the 3rd ODI, but due to its incomplete construction works, the match was shifted to Khan Shaheb Osman Ali Stadium at Fatullah.
 In 2014 when Sri Lanka toured Bangladesh, the stadium was proposed to host the 3rd ODI, but Sri Lanka did not agree to tour the stadium for some safety concerns, and the match was shifted to Sher-e-Bangla National Stadium in Dhaka.
 The venue has hosted the first leg (8 matches) of BPL 2017 for the first time.
 The venue hosted its first test on 3 November 2018 when Zimbabwe toured Bangladesh.
 The venue hosted its inaugural ODI on 14 December 2018 when West Indies toured Bangladesh.
 The venue hosted limited number of Bangladesh Premier League matches since the 5th season.
 In February 2020, the BCB moved the three match ODI series against Zimbabwe from Chittagong to this venue to give it more exposure and international attention.

International centuries
Shai Hope scored the first century at this ground in its inaugural ODI match when West Indies toured Bangladesh in 2018-19. While Liton Das became first Bangladeshi batsman to score a century at this venue when Zimbabwe toured Bangladesh in March 2020.

ODI centuries

Women's Twenty20 International centuries
The following table summarises the Women's Twenty20 International centuries scored at Sylhet International Cricket Stadium.

Under-19 ODI centuries
The following table summarises the Under-19 ODI centuries scored at Sylhet International Cricket Stadium.

Sylhet International Cricket Stadium Academy Ground

Sylhet Outer Stadium or Sylhet International Cricket Stadium Academy Ground is a cricket ground in Sylhet, adjacent to the main stadium. Initially it was built for practice purposes for players during international matches. However, later it was developed to international standards with BCB expecting to host international matches, particularly Test matches on this ground.

History
The ground hosted its first international match on 1 October 2022 during the 2022 Women's Twenty20 Asia Cup, with Bangladesh taking on Thailand. The venue hosted 9 matches of the Women's Asia Cup while 15 matches were hosted on the main stadium.

Gallery

See also

List of stadiums in Asia
List of international cricket grounds in Bangladesh
Stadiums in Bangladesh
List of international cricket five-wicket hauls in Sylhet International Cricket Stadium

References

External links
 CricketArchive

Cricket grounds in Bangladesh
Sport in Sylhet
Buildings and structures in Sylhet